The Diocese of  Kagera is a diocese in the Anglican Church of Tanzania: its current bishop is Darlington Bendankeha. The diocese has a special link with Beccles.

Notes

Anglican Church of Tanzania dioceses
Anglican bishops of Kagera
Kagera Region